Auratonota hydrogramma is a species of moth of the family Tortricidae. It is widespread throughout the lowlands Neotropics, from Costa Rica to Bahia on the Atlantic coast of eastern Brazil.

References

Moths described in 1912
Auratonota
Moths of North America
Moths of South America